Baxter is a city in Putnam County, Tennessee, United States. The population was 1,578 at the 2020 census. It is part of the Cookeville, Tennessee Micropolitan Statistical Area.

Geography 
Baxter is located at  (36.155012, -85.636365).

Baxter was affected by the Tornado outbreak of March 2–3, 2020.

Demographics

2020 census

As of the 2020 United States census, there were 1,578 people, 584 households, and 372 families residing in the town.

2000 census
As of the census of 2000, there were 1,279 people, 548 households, and 357 families residing in the city. The population density was 690.4 people per square mile (266.9/km2). There were 618 housing units at an average density of 333.6 per square mile (129.0/km2). The racial makeup of the city was 97.89% White, 0.70% Native American, 0.08% Pacific Islander, 0.47% from other races, and 0.86% from two or more races. Hispanic or Latino of any race were 1.72% of the population.

There were 548 households, out of which 28.6% had children under the age of 18 living with them, 51.5% were married couples living together, 10.8% had a female householder with no husband present, and 34.7% were non-families. 31.6% of all households were made up of individuals, and 15.5% had someone living alone who was 65 years of age or older. The average household size was 2.33 and the average family size was 2.94.

In the city, the population was spread out, with 24.5% under the age of 18, 7.8% from 18 to 24, 25.4% from 25 to 44, 24.6% from 45 to 64, and 17.7% who were 65 years of age or older. The median age was 40 years. For every 100 females, there were 89.5 males. For every 100 females age 18 and over, there were 81.6 males.

The median income for a household in the city was $25,078, and the median income for a family was $30,083. Males had a median income of $21,731 versus $19,118 for females. The per capita income for the city was $12,708. About 19.2% of families and 23.3% of the population were below the poverty line, including 28.2% of those under the age of 18 and 17.7% of those 65 and older.

Education
Baxter is served by the Putnam County School District with Upperman High School as the local high school.

References

External links 

Upperman High School
Upperman Middle School
Cornerstone Elementary School
Baxter Primary School

Cities in Putnam County, Tennessee
Cookeville, Tennessee micropolitan area